In Greek mythology, Mnesileus (Ancient Greek: Μνησίλεως Mnesileos) or Mnasinous (Μνασίνους) was the son of Polydeuces, one of the Dioscuri, and Phoebe, daughter of Leucippus of Messenia. The temple of the Dioscuri at Argos contained also the statues of these two sons of the Dioscuri, Anaxias and Mnasinous, and on the throne of Amyclae both were represented riding on horseback.

Notes

References 

 Apollodorus, The Library with an English Translation by Sir James George Frazer, F.B.A., F.R.S. in 2 Volumes, Cambridge, MA, Harvard University Press; London, William Heinemann Ltd. 1921. ISBN 0-674-99135-4. Online version at the Perseus Digital Library. Greek text available from the same website.
 Pausanias, Description of Greece with an English Translation by W.H.S. Jones, Litt.D., and H.A. Ormerod, M.A., in 4 Volumes. Cambridge, MA, Harvard University Press; London, William Heinemann Ltd. 1918. . Online version at the Perseus Digital Library
 Pausanias, Graeciae Descriptio. 3 vols. Leipzig, Teubner. 1903. Greek text available at the Perseus Digital Library.
 Sextus Propertius, Elegies from Charm. Vincent Katz. trans. Los Angeles. Sun & Moon Press. 1995. Online version at the Perseus Digital Library. Latin text available at the same website.

Characters in Greek mythology
Messenian mythology